Skull Orchard is the debut solo  album by Jon Langford, recorded in August 1997 and released on January 20, 1998 by Sugar Free Records, a Chicago-based label. Skull Orchard, described on its release in 1998 as Langford's most Welsh release ever, had  two homonymically-linked themes: Wales and whales which came together in the "Youghal" track, about the filming of the 1956 movie Moby Dick in coastal Wales. In 2011 the album was re-recorded and re-issued with the title Skull Orchard Revisted by Langford backed by the Burlington Welsh Male Chorus, based in Toronto.

Background 
By the time of its release, The Skull Orchards, initially a songwriting project, had evolved into a full blown band with Langford on guitar and vocals, Chicago guitarist Mark Durante (ex-Revolting Cocks, KMFDM), drummer Steve Goulding (ex-Gang of Four, Graham Parker & the Rumour) and bass player Alan Doughty (ex-Jesus Jones). Among other musicians who took part in recording the album were Mekons' Sally Timms (backing vocals) and Rico Bell (accordion), Drag City Records artist Edith Frost, Bottle Rockets bassist Tom Ray and the Texas Rubies' Jane Baxter Miller.

Having lived in America for the previous five years, Skull Orchard saw Langford turning his attention back across the Atlantic to the country he grew up in. According to BBC Radio Wales, "seen through the eyes of an exile, South Wales is a sad, neglected place where mines and factories close down as toxic waste dumps and McDonalds appear out of nowhere. Only the defiant spirit of its people keeps the place alive". Wordy and angry the album's songs "reflect that spirit and represent a major departure for Langford's songwriting", according to Sassy Hicks of the BBC.

Critical reception 

AllMusic called it "a smart, stripped-down collection of tuneful rockers that bitterly reflect on the state of his native Wales" and "a worthy addition to the Mekons/Waco Brothers legacy". According to NME, Skull Orchard is Langford's "irate musings upon his dispirited, neglected homeland; a record which celebrates Welshness against a backdrop of closing mines and factories and grinding poverty". It was "all the more an achievement for a man who has been living in America for the past five years," the reviewer wrote on July 6, 1998. The New York Times characterised the band as 'straightforward' and 'streamlined', describing the songs of the album as "country-rock with an infusion of The Who". "Smart, cynical and still impassioned about the state of humanity, Langford has recharged his music by stripping away any indulgences," critic Jon Pareles wrote. Robert Christgau of Village Voice (giving the album the A− rating) remarked: "Anyone who's tried to keep up with <Langford's> one-liners knows he's an articulate bastard, but he's better off when he doesn't have to get to the end in 75 words or less... Here he runs on, confessing his antisocial tendencies like the singer-songwriter he temporarily is without forgetting that capitalism is antisocial too".

Musicians 

 Fred Armisen - percussion 
 Jane Baxter-Miller - vocals 
 Rico Bell - accordion 
 Tracy Dear - mandolin
 Alan Doughty - bass guitar, vocals 
 Mark Durante - guitar 
 Lu Edmonds - vocals 
 Edith Frost - vocals 
 Steve Goulding - drums 
 John Hiatt - vocals 
 Jon Langford - etching, guitar, vocals 
 Paul Mertens - brass, flute (alto), overdubs, sax (baritone) 
 Tom Ray - ukulele 
 John Rice - fiddle 
 Dean Schlabowske - vocals

Personnel 
 Mike Hagler - engineer, recorder 
 Ken Sluiter - engineer, mastering, mixing, recorder 
 Casey Orr - photography 
 Marty Perez - photography 
 Mark Price - translation

Track list 
Skull Orchard

Skull Orchard Revisted

All songs written by Jon Langford.

References 

1998 albums
Jon Langford albums